EndNote Click (formerly Kopernio) is a freely available plugin allowing researchers to access papers in subscription-based scientific journals, to which they are subscribed through their higher education libraries, even when the user is off-campus. Using artificial intelligence, the tool automatically records the institutional subscriptions each user has and searches for full-text versions of selected papers to which the user may have access.

Kopernio 

The tool was created by the tech startup Kopernio, which was founded in 2017 by Mendeley co-founder Jan Reichelt and Newsflo co-founder Ben Kaube. The startup was acquired by Clarivate Analytics in April 2018 for £3.5 million, whereupon Reichelt became managing director for the Web of Science and Kaube became Kopernio's managing director. Clarivate intends to incorporate the Kopernio tool into Web of Science.

References

External links

Software companies established in 2017
Academic publishing
Clarivate